Athletics at the 2013 Canada Summer Games was in Sherbrooke, Quebec at the Université de Sherbrooke Stadium.  It was held from the 12 to 16 August.  There were 54 events of athletics.

Medal table

The following is the medal table for athletics at the 2013 Canada Summer Games.

The following medal table provides a statistical analysis by subtracting, focusing, and combining paralympic and Special Olympic events from the total medals counted. This table sorts by total medals minus PSO.
Key 
PSO = Paralympic and Special Olympic

Results

Men

Men's Para and Special Olympic events

Women

Women's Para and Special Olympic events

References

External links 

2013 Canada Summer Games
Canada Games
2013